Ixhuatlán may refer to:

 Mexico:
Ixhuatlán del Café, Veracruz
Ixhuatlán del Sureste, Veracruz
Ixhuatlán de Madero